Bratina Lagoon is a tidal lagoon of sand flats, ponds, and channels, about  long and  wide, located on the southwest side of Bratina Island, which lies off the northern tip of Brown Peninsula, Ross Ice Shelf. It was named by the New Zealand Geographic Board at the suggestion of Clive Howard-Williams in association with Bratina Island.

References
 

Lagoons of Antarctica
Landforms of Victoria Land
Scott Coast